Romance of the White Haired Maiden is a 1999 Taiwanese television series adapted from the wuxia novel Baifa Monü Zhuan by Liang Yusheng. Alternative Chinese titles for the series include Yidai Xianü (一代俠女) and Baifa Xianü (白髮俠女).

Plot
The story begins in the 43rd year of the reign of the Wanli Emperor during the Ming dynasty. Zhuo Yihang of the Wudang Sect falls in love with the legendary heroine Lian Nichang, disregarding his lover's past feud with his sect.

The treacherous eunuch Wei Zhongxian secretly murders the Taichang Emperor and replaces him with the young Tianqi Emperor, who is effectively a puppet ruler under Wei's control. Wei schemes with the Manchu leader Nurhachi to seize control of Ming China.

Lian Nichang's senior, Murong Chong, is actually a spy working for the Manchus. In order to achieve his ambition of dominating the wulin (martial artists' community), he uses a trick to turn Lian and Zhuo Yihang against each other. Lian falsely believes that Zhuo has betrayed her love and her hair turns white overnight. She leaves Zhuo in anger and travels to the remote regions of northern China. Zhuo is unwilling to give up on Lian and he finally resolves his misunderstanding with her after experiencing hardships.

Zhuo and Lian rally a group of martial artists to help them deal with the Manchu invaders. The heroes defeat the Manchu army at Shanhai Pass and temporarily halt the invasion. By then, the Tianqi Emperor had died and is succeeded by the Chongzhen Emperor. Chongzhen believes slanderous rumours and puts the patriotic general Yuan Chonghuan to death. Without Yuan to defend Shanhai Pass, Zhuo and Lian foresee that Ming China will eventually fall to the Manchus. They decide to permanently retire from the jianghu and lead reclusive lives.

Cast
 Jiang Qinqin as Lian Nichang
 Julian Cheung as Zhuo Yihang
 Lin Fangbing as Red Flower Devil Mother
 Chen Chun-sheng as Murong Chong
 Zhang Heng as Meng Qiuxia
 Ku Pao-ming as Xiao Xiao
 Chang Chin as Miao Huichun
 Chang Luo-chun as Wang Zhaoxi
 Li Hui-ying as Tie Shanhu
 Feng Kuang-jung as Tudou
 Geng Yong as Duniangzi
 Chou Shao-tung as Wei Zhongxian
 Wang Bozhao as Zhu Changluo
 Yu Chia-hui as He E'hua
 Liu Kemian as Geng Shaonan
 Liu Naiyi as Taoist Qingsong

External links

Taiwanese wuxia television series
Works based on Baifa Monü Zhuan
1999 Taiwanese television series debuts
Television series set in the Ming dynasty
Television shows based on works by Liang Yusheng
Television series set in the 17th century